KYMK-FM (106.3 MHz) is a commercial radio station located in Maurice, Louisiana, broadcasting to the Lafayette, Louisiana area. KYMK airs an alternative rock music format branded as "106Three Radio Lafayette." Pittman flipped 106.3 to urban contemporary (as "The Juice 106.3") in 2009. Before that, they flipped to Hot AC from Jones Radio Networks' Smooth Jazz format on Friday, March 28, 2008. On March 31, the station officially switched calls from KKSJ to KYMK. As a smooth jazz-formatted station, KKSJ was branded as "Smooth Jazz 106".

KYMK's studios are located on Evangeline Thruway in Carencro, and its transmitter is located southwest of Maurice in rural Vermilion Parish, Louisiana.

Current on-air staff
Leblanc - Mornings

Morgan Pierce - Middays and Homegrown (specialty show)

Brigette Rose - Afternoons

Clint Domingue - Weeknights and Saturdays

Tanya Ardoin - Sundays (specialty show)

References

External links
 106Three Radio Lafayette

Radio stations in Louisiana